Camp Ramah Darom is a Jewish summer camp affiliated with the Conservative movement in Clayton, Georgia.

History
Camp Ramah Darom opened in 1997. The camp aims to inspire a lifelong love of Jewish values, tradition and community. The lake is fed by  mountain brooks and a  waterfall. Ramah Darom attracts campers and staff from Georgia, Florida, North Carolina, South Carolina, Texas, Oklahoma, Israel, Tennessee, Alabama, Louisiana, Mississippi, Ohio, Illinois, Arkansas, and Nebraska. The camp is co-ed, Hebrew speaking, and kosher. All staff are college or university students.

The summer is divided into two four-week sessions, Aleph and Bet.  Generally campers attend one session, while some opt to go both sessions.  The minimum eidah (age-group) to attend either Session Aleph or Bet is Nitzanim. rising 4th graders.  The minimum edah to attend both Session Aleph and Bet is Chalutzim, rising 6th graders.   However, for the oldest edah, Gesher, attendance to both sessions is required.

Rabbi Sykes, the camp's first director, was replaced by Geoff Menkowitz, a former Assistant Director. The staff includes a delegation of Israelis.

Special needs programs
The Tikvah Support Program was inaugurated in 2015.  This program offers a summer experience for campers diagnosed with Neurodevelopmental Disorders.  Tikvah Support Staff members are specially trained to work with children in this program. It is open to children in sixth through twelfth grade.

The camp also hosts Camp Yofi, a special 5-day session (held after the main sessions) for families with autistic children.  Programs and activities are provided for the children and their siblings, as well as the parents.

See also
Conservative Judaism
Jewish education

References

External links
Ramah Darom website

Darom
Youth organizations based in Georgia (U.S. state)
Buildings and structures in Rabun County, Georgia
1997 establishments in Georgia (U.S. state)
Jews and Judaism in Georgia (U.S. state)